"Waiting for the End" is a song by American rock band Linkin Park, released on October 1, 2010. It is the second single and eighth track from their fourth studio album, A Thousand Suns, which was released on September 14, 2010. A music video for the single, directed by Joe Hahn, was released on October 8, 2010 on MTV.

It received mostly positive reviews from critics and reached number 42 on the US Billboard Hot 100.

"Waiting for the End", along with five other songs from A Thousand Suns, is featured in the "Linkin Park Track Pack" as downloadable content for the rhythm video game Guitar Hero: Warriors of Rock. The track pack was released on October 19, 2010. It was also released as one of six Linkin Park songs released in a pack for Rock Band 3 on January 11, 2011, though it was the only track from A Thousand Suns to be included in that pack.

Background
"Waiting for the End" was announced as the album's second single at the time of the album's release.

The track features minimal distorted guitar and differs from many previous Linkin Park singles. The song features reggae-style verses by Mike Shinoda followed by both chorus and verses sung by Chester Bennington. The breakdown of the song uses remixed portions of Bennington's vocals.
This song was featured in CSI on CBS on October 14, 2010.

Music video

The official music video is directed by Joe Hahn. The video was filmed in September 2010, before the release of A Thousand Suns and was released to MTV on Friday October 8, 2010.
The video features the entire band performing the song in darkness along with heavily experimental digital effects and distortion applied to them. The video also carries the themes of the artwork for their album, A Thousand Suns, with many shots of abstract artworks featuring animals and digital-themed media.

As of December 2022, the music video for "Waiting for the End" has over 220 million views on YouTube.

Joe Hahn wrote a blog post describing the music video:

In celebration of the band's North American tour, an alternate live video of the song premiered in the band's official site and YouTube channel. It was filmed by numerous fans on January 26, 2011 at the United Center in Chicago, and January 28 at the Xcel Energy Center in St. Paul. The version played in the video is the actual live performance of the song.

The video was placed at #28 of the year by VH1's Top 40 Videos of the Year.

Reception
Michael Menachem of Billboard gave the song a positive review, saying " 'Waiting for the End' offers the grandness of 'Numb' and 'Faint', but producer Rick Rubin's polyrhythmic framework and the group's moralistic lyrics set it apart from Linkin Park's past hits." MTV's James Montgomery praised the song, describing it as "one part soaring, big-boned ballad, one part rattling, slightly Ragga dancehall toast, and zero parts anything LP have previously attempted." Tim Grierson of About.com listed the song as the fifteenth best rock song of 2010, saying that "Balancing rapped and sung vocals, the hopeful, resilient track builds to a beautifully rousing finale."

During a Twitch stream in 2020, Mike Shinoda revealed that "Waiting for the End" is his favourite Linkin Park song.

Live performances
The song was performed live at the MTV Europe Music Awards in 2010. It was also performed on Saturday Night Live on February 5, 2011. "Waiting for the End" is the only single to be performed at all concerts in the A Thousand Suns World Tour ("The Catalyst" was not performed at the Sunrise, Florida concert; "Burning in the Skies" never received a full performance until the Australia leg; and "Iridescent" was not performed at most concerts at the Australia leg).

Commercial performance
"Waiting for the End" debuted at number 96 on the US Billboard Hot 100 upon the release of the album. After falling off and re-entering the chart more than once, it has reached number 42, remaining 23 weeks on the chart. It has also obtained number 2 on the Rock Songs chart. After spending 15 weeks on the Alternative Songs chart, it replaced "Tighten Up" by The Black Keys at number 1, giving the band their tenth number 1 song on the chart. As of June 2014, the single has sold over 1,058,000 copies in the US, becoming their 9th best selling single in the US. Despite peaking lower than "The Catalyst", it was the most successful single in the US from the album. Outside the US, the song was generally less successful than "The Catalyst".

Chester Bennington said this about the success of the single in an interview with MTV on February 7, 2011:

Track listing
All songs written and composed by Linkin Park.

Personnel
 Chester Bennington – lead vocals, backing vocals (on second rap part, and outro)
 Mike Shinoda – keyboard, piano, vocals, guitar, sampler 
 Brad Delson – guitar
 Dave "Phoenix" Farrell – bass guitar, backing vocals
 Joe Hahn – turntables, samples, programming
 Rob Bourdon – drums, percussion

Charts

Weekly charts

Year-end charts

Decade-end charts

Certifications

References

Linkin Park songs
2010 songs
2010 singles
Song recordings produced by Rick Rubin
Songs written by Mike Shinoda
Warner Records singles
Trip hop songs
Space rock songs
Reggae rock songs